Chomu (Sanskrit chau meaning four, mouh meaning mouth or way)  is a town and municipality, near the city of Jaipur in Jaipur district in the state of Rajasthan, India.

Near cities

Jaipur 
Chomu is located nearly 35 km away from Jaipur city.

Reengus (Sri Madhopur)
Chomu shares its boundaries with Sri Madhopur tehsil of sikar district in north and east directions.  Reengus  town (Sri Madhopur tehsil) is located about 33 km from Chomu.

Mundru (Sri Madhopur) 
Mundru village is located about 29 km from Chomu in an east direction. 
SH 37 starts from Chomu city to Rajgarh (Churu) via Ajitgarh ; Sri Madhopur ; Udaipurwati ; Jhunjhunu ;  Chirawa ;  Pilani ; Rajgarh, its other branch goes to Singhana via Neem ka thana ; Khetri.

Renwal
It is located nearly 40 km away from Chomu, in west direction.

Shahpura 
SH 37 proceeds from Samode to Shahpura. Shahpura is about 47 km away from Chomu.

Demographics

 census of India, Chomu town is divided into 30 wards for which elections are held every five years. The town has a population of 64617 of which 33,850 are males while 30,567 are females.

The town has an average literacy rate of 79.35%, higher than the national average of 74.04% and State average of 66.11%; with male literacy of 90.19% and female literacy of 67.62%. 13.93% of the population is under 6 years of age.

 Chomu all info

History

According to local history, Chomu was established on Akshiya Trutiya, 1595, By Samod's Raaval Thakur Karan Singh s.o Raaval Thakur Manohardas. The draft and design of the town was proposed by Pandit Beniprasad Bhaatara. 
According to local historian Vaidh Kailashnath Shastri, Thakur Manohardas along with Lakkhi Banjara, laid the foundation of the "Baavli" near the Surajpol Gate on the eastern entrance whose construction was completed in 1640. Later, the grandson of Thakur Karan Singh, Thakur Mohan Singh began the construction of the wall surrounding the city, entrances and canal, all of which were finally completed in 1719.

An annual fest is held every year on 26 April in honor of the founders and of the town.

Politics
Chomu is one of the 13 sub-districts in Jaipur and it consists of 3 blocks and covers nearly 80 villages.

Chomu's current MLA is sh. Ramlal Sharma (BJP) and former MLA was sh. Bhagwan Sahai Saini (Congress). Chomu has its own municipality and 37 wards.

References

Chomu city all info.

Cities and towns in Jaipur district